Can't Buy Me Like is a 2013 book by Bob Garfield and Doug Levy. Can't Buy Me Like focuses on demonstrating to marketers how to build meaningful business returns in the Relationship Era by cultivating authentic customer relationships. The book was published in March 2013 by the Penguin Group.

The book proposes an ongoing shift in marketing from the Consumer Era, where marketers spin product advertising, to the Relationship Era, where companies who have a core purpose and care about something other than selling products sell more of their products. It indicates that the success of companies in the Relationship Era is based on authenticity, trust, and relationships.

Synopsis 
Can't Buy Me Like is a narrative that proposes that the Relationship Era is a new direction for marketing and advertising. A purpose is required for companies to succeed in the Relationship Era.

The book is divided into an introduction, 11 chapters, and an Authors' Afterword and Acknowledgements section. It is written in narrative format and includes case histories from large and small businesses and public and proprietary data. It also has graphics, charts, and step—by—step instructions for succeeding in the Relationship Era. The book emphasizes the importance of purpose in the branding statements of companies.

As indicated in the book's introduction, "At the most basic level, Can't Buy Me Like is a book about a simple truth: if you are still selling goods and services by blanketing the world with advertising, trying to persuade or entertain or flatter consumers into submission, you are doing things all wrong. Because the world has changed. A lot."

Release and reception 
Can't Buy Me Like was well received in the business and marketing fields.  It was profiled in The Street, CBC TV, Hispanic Marketing, and Forbes.

Jack Covert of 800CEORead praised Can't Buy Me Like for its refreshing and clear roadmap to success in the Relationship Era.

"The book is full of stories about companies that soared in the Consumer Era and are struggling in the Relationship Era and of companies now thriving in the Relationship Era. In many cases, these examples are of such ubiquitous brands that we can't help but see the immediate wisdom in the appraisal of the situation. Garfield and Levy bring their decades of experience in advertising and brand analysis to (literally) lay out a map that companies can use to move toward more sustainable and profitable relationships with their customers."

Can't Buy Me Like and its authors, Garfield and Levy, have also been featured on radio shows such as KERA and NPR, the American Marketing Association podcast, and articles in PBS, MediaPost, Slate.com, Destination CRM, and The Motley Fool, among others.

See also 

 Social marketing

References 

2013 non-fiction books
Marketing books
Portfolio (publisher) books